Marlene Sinnig (born 11 December 1984 in Rostock) is a German rower. At the 2012 Summer Olympics, she competed in the Women's coxless pair with Kerstin Hartmann.

References

Rowers from Rostock
Living people
Olympic rowers of Germany
Rowers at the 2012 Summer Olympics
German female rowers
1984 births
European Rowing Championships medalists